Lynn Raenie Williams (born May 21, 1993) is an American professional soccer player who plays for NJ/NY Gotham FC in the National Women's Soccer League (NWSL) and the United States national team. She previously played for the Kansas City Current, Western New York Flash in NWSL and Western Sydney Wanderers and Melbourne Victory in the Australian A-League Women.

Early life
Born in Fresno, California to Christine and David Williams, Lynn attended Bullard High School where she played on the varsity team and earned all-league and all-area honors all four years. Williams set the school record in scoring with 117 career goals (for boys or girls) and finished her high school career with 47 assists. As a senior in 2011, she was named to the ESPN RISE All-American third team and scored 50 goals. The same year, she helped the team to win county and section titles and was the runner-up at the regional final. She was also named Player of the Year by the Fresno Bee.

Pepperdine Waves, 2011–2014
Williams attended Pepperdine University from 2011 to 2014 where she played for the Waves. During her freshman season, she started in all 20 games and finished third on the team with six goals and led the Waves with eight assists. Her 20 points ranked second on the team. She was named West Coast Conference (WCC) Freshman of the Year and earned Soccer America Freshman All-American first team, NSCAA All-West Region second team, All-WCC second team and WCC All-Freshman team honors. Williams set a new school record of five consecutive games with a point and tied for second with two multi-assist games.

As a sophomore in 2012, Williams led the Waves ranked third on the team and sixth in the league in goals (8) and points (19). She led the WCC in shots (97) and shots per game (4.6) for the second consecutive season. She scored her first collegiate hat trick on October 23. Her season performance earned her NSCAA All-West Region and All-WCC first team and All-WCC first team honors. In 2013, Williams started the first 15 games of the season and posted 11 goals and 3 assists (25 points) before missing the last few games due to injury. She ranked first in the WCC for goals per game (0.73, also third in the school's history), tied for second in game-winning goals and third in points per game (1.67, also fourth in the school's history). She set a school single-game record for shots with 14 on September 22. Williams earned NSCAA All-West Region first team and All-WCC first team honors and was named the National Player of the Week by the NSCAA and CollegeSoccer360.com after scoring the game-winning goal against Wright State in August and then netting two goals and an assist against Texas A&M in early September. She was also named WCC Player of the Week.

Williams led the Waves with 14 goals and 10 assists in 22 starts during her senior season. Her performance helped lift the team to the third Sweet 16 appearance in the program's history. She was a finalist for the Hermann Trophy, was named first-team All-American by the NSCAA and Soccer America as well as All-WCC first team for the third straight year. Her 14 goals ranked third in the WCC and tied for second highest in the school's history. Her 38 points also ranked second in the school's history. Williams set a new school record for shots with 130 and ranked first in the WCC. She was named WCC Player of the Week three times and Top Drawer Soccer National Player of the Week after scoring two game-winning goals.

Club career

Western New York Flash, 2015–2016
Williams was selected sixth overall by the Western New York Flash during the 2015 NWSL College Draft. She made her debut for the club during the team's season opener against the Seattle Reign FC on April 12, 2015. In her 17 appearances during the season, Williams scored four goals. The Flash finished in seventh place with a  record.

Williams was one of the breakout stars of the 2016 NWSL season. She scored 11 goals which was tied with Houston Dash forward Kealia Ohai for most in the league. Williams was awarded the Golden Boot as she had more assists then Ohai. Williams was named 2016 NWSL Most Valuable Players and was in the 2016 NWSL Best XI. In the NWSL Playoffs Williams scored two goals in extra time as the Flash upset the Portland Thorns in the semi-final and advanced to the Championship Game. In the 2016 NWSL Championship Game Williams scored a game tying header in the last minute of extra time to force the game to penalties. Williams converted her penalty as the Flash went on to defeat the Washington Spirit.

North Carolina Courage, 2017–2021
It was announced on January 9, 2017, that the Western New York Flash was officially sold to new ownership, moved to North Carolina, and rebranded as the North Carolina Courage. Williams scored 9 goals for North Carolina in 2017 and was named to the Team of the Month for April. North Carolina won the Shield in 2017 but lost to the Portland Thorns in the NWSL Championship Game.

Williams had a very successful 2018 season. She scored 14 goals, which was tied for second best in the league. She was named Player of the Week twice as was named to the NWSL Second XI. North Carolina won its second straight NWSL Shield and Williams was named a finalist for NWSL Most Valuable Player. She played every minute of North Carolina's playoff games in 2018 as the Courage won the 2018 NWSL Championship by defeating the Portland Thorns 3–0 in the final.

Loan to Western Sydney Wanderers
In October 2019, Williams travelled to Australia to join W-League club Western Sydney Wanderers on loan. In February 2020, she terminated her contract early to focus on her international career.

Loan to Melbourne Victory
In December 2021, Williams returned to Australia, signing with Melbourne Victory as a guest player on a month-long loan. Her loan ended on January 13, 2022.

Kansas City Current, 2022 
On Monday January 10, Williams was traded to the Kansas City Current from the North Carolina Courage for $200,000 in allocation money, the rights to goalkeeper Katelyn Rowland and a 1st round pick in the 2023 NWSL Draft. This reunites Williams with former Courage teammates Sam Mewis, Kristen Hamilton, and Hailie Mace.

Williams was injured on March 18, 2022, suffering a right leg injury, missing the remainder of the 2022 NWSL season.

Gotham FC, 2023– 
On Thursday January 12, 2023, during the NWSL Draft, Williams was traded by the Kansas City Current to Gotham FC in exchange for the 2nd pick overall pick.

International career

After a breakout 2016 NWSL season Williams received her first call-up to the United States women's national team in October 2016 for a pair of friendlies against Switzerland. She earned her first cap on October 19. Williams entered as a substitute at the beginning of the second half and scored the fastest debut goal in team history as she scored 49 seconds after entering the game. Her record was broken four days later when Kealia Ohai scored 48 seconds after entering the game.

In 2017 Williams was named to the roster for the 2017 SheBelieves Cup, where she scored the game-winning goal in a 1–0 win for the U.S over Germany. Her goal was the only one the U.S scored in the tournament as they finished in last place. Williams was called up for the 2017 Tournament of Nations.

In 2018 Williams was named to the roster for the 2018 SheBelieves Cup, where the U.S. WNT won the tournament for the second time. Williams played in the team's first four games of the year including all three SheBelieves Cup games, but soon fell off the national team radar.  She received a call-up for a pair of friendlies against Mexico in April 2018, but didn't play in either game. Williams was on the 35 player provisional roster for the 2018 CONCACAF Women's Championship but wasn't named to the final 20 player roster.

In late 2019, after incoming head coach Vlatko Andonovski took over for a retiring Jill Ellis, Williams was again called up to the national team. She played in both of the team's November friendlies against Sweden and Costa Rica, marking her first caps in 20 months. In her first five games back with the team, including the CONCACAF Olympic qualifying tournament, Williams tallied five goals and five assists.

On June 23, 2021, Williams was included on the roster for the United States at the 2020 Summer Olympics.

International summary

International goals

Olympic appearances

Personal life
Williams met her boyfriend, Marley Biyendolo, at Pepperdine.

Honors and awards
Western New York Flash
NWSL Champions: 2016

North Carolina Courage
NWSL Champions: 2018, 2019
NWSL Shield: 2017, 2018, 2019
United States
SheBelieves Cup: 2018; 2020, 2021; 2022, 2023
 CONCACAF Women's Olympic Qualifying Tournament: 2020
 Olympic Bronze Medal: 2020
 Individual
 NWSL Golden Boot: 2016
 NWSL Most Valuable Player: 2016
NWSL Best XI: 2016
NWSL Second XI: 2018
 Hermann Trophy finalist: 2014

See also 
 List of American and Canadian soccer champions
 List of foreign W-League (Australia) players

References

Match reports

Further reading 
 Grainey, Timothy (2012), Beyond Bend It Like Beckham: The Global Phenomenon of Women's Soccer, University of Nebraska Press, 
 Lisi, Clemente A. (2010), The U.S. Women's Soccer Team: An American Success Story, Scarecrow Press, 
 Murray, Caitlin (2019), The National Team: The Inside Story of the Women Who Changed Soccer , Abrams,  
 Schultz, Jaime (2014), Qualifying Times: Points of Change in U.S. Women's Sport, University of Illinois Press,

External links

 Western New York Flash player profile 
 Pepperdine player profile
 
 

1993 births
Living people
National Women's Soccer League players
Western New York Flash players
American women's soccer players
Women's association football forwards
Pepperdine Waves women's soccer players
United States women's international soccer players
Sportspeople from Fresno, California
Soccer players from California
Western New York Flash draft picks
North Carolina Courage players
Western Sydney Wanderers FC (A-League Women) players
Melbourne Victory FC (A-League Women) players
African-American women's soccer players
A-League Women players
Footballers at the 2020 Summer Olympics
Olympic bronze medalists for the United States in soccer
Medalists at the 2020 Summer Olympics
21st-century African-American sportspeople
21st-century African-American women
Kansas City Current players